Chionothremma pythia is a species of moth of the family Tortricidae. It is found in New Guinea.

The wingspan is 18–26 mm. The forewings are snow-white, but the base is yellow towards the costa. There is a slender blackish costal streak, continued round termen by a fine black line forming small triangular spots with some faint pale yellow suffusion round these. The hindwings are grey.

References

Moths described in 1920
Chionothremma
Taxa named by Edward Meyrick